Naftalan is a city in Azerbaijan, surrounded by the district of Goranboy. It's located on an agricultural plain near the Lesser Caucasus Mountains. The word naftalan also means a petroleum product that can be obtained there. It is the centre of a unique petroleum industry, with a grade of oil referred to as "Naftalan".

Etymology 
The word Naftalan, can be traced to the Greek word "naphtha" ("νάφθα"), meaning pertaining to oil, and the Azerbaijani suffix "-alan", which is of the verb "to take" (and literally meaning "oil buyer").

History 
Archaeological findings in the region date to the 12th century AD. Naftalan city was functioning as a settlement within the Goranboy and Yevlakh districts until 1967. On April 28, 1967, Naftalan was granted the status of the subordinate city. The city of Naftalan consists of a city and two villages. The base of Naftalan city is Sanatorium - Resort infrastructure. Naftalan Resort has been operating since 1933. In 1938, the Naftalan Experimental Laboratory was established in the Azerbaijan Scientific-Research Institute of Medical Rehabilitation. The biological and therapeutic effects of the Naftalan oil began to be studied there. Also, in 1965, Scientific Research Laboratory was established in Naftalan.

In the 2010s, the number of hotels increased in the city after the Azerbaijani government's tourism policy.

Geography 

Naftalan city is located 330 km west of Baku, 50 km from Ganja in the foothills of the Lesser Caucasus Mountains. It's located at an altitude of 225 m above sea level. The spring is warm, the winter is soft here. The average annual temperature is +14.8 degrees. The wind in Naftalan is mainly monsoon.  The city's territory is 35.73 km2.

Demographics 

According to the 1999 census, the population in Naftalan was 7,551. As of 2017, the population of the city is 8718 persons.

Ethnic Groups Population (1979 census)
 Azerbaijanis 3,245 (90,6%)
 Tatars 6 (0.2%)
 Russians 136 (3.8%)
 Armenians 182 (5.1%)
 Lezgins 7 (0.2%)

Economy

Petroleum spas 

The area is home to petroleum spas (or "oil spas"), that were popular vacation spots of the Soviet Union. At the height of their Soviet-era popularity, the spas in Naftalan had 75,000 visitors a year. The combination of the  First Nagorno-Karabakh War and the end of Soviet-sponsored free trips brought the industry to its knees in the late-1980s. All but one of the older spas were converted into refugee housing. The remaining spa, the Naftalan Therapeutic Center, had 1,000-beds.

The number of domestic and foreign tourists coming to Naftalan, which has a capacity of about 2200 tourists a day, has increased by 5-6 times in 2016 and counted 30,000.

Culture 
There are two Houses of Culture that promote national traditions. Also, there is the Naftalan Museum and Music School. There are four parks in the city of Naftalan.

Education
There are three general education schools and one Children's Creative Center in the city.

Transport 
Naftalan resort city can be reached by car or train from Baku and Ganja cities. The closest route for foreign visitors is the flight to Ganja International Airport.

Twin towns 

Naftalan is twinned with:
 Yessentuki, Russia (since 2014)

References

External links 

World Gazetteer: Azerbaijan – World-Gazetteer.com

 
Populated places in Goranboy District
Nagorno-Karabakh
Resorts in Azerbaijan
1967 establishments in Azerbaijan